Kip Lee Gross (born August 24, 1964) is an American former professional baseball pitcher who played for the Cincinnati Reds, Los Angeles Dodgers, Nippon-Ham Fighters, Boston Red Sox and Houston Astros in Major League Baseball and Nippon Professional Baseball between 1990 and 2000.

Biography
Gross was born in Scottsbluff, Nebraska, and played college baseball both at Murray State Jc (where he was drafted in the 3rd round of the January draft) and the University of Nebraska–Lincoln. In 1985, he played collegiate summer baseball with the Hyannis Mets of the Cape Cod Baseball League. He was drafted by the New York Mets in the 4th round of the 1986 Major League Baseball draft. He played his first MLB game on April 21, 1990 with the Cincinnati Reds.

Gross played for four different ball clubs during his career: the Cincinnati Reds from 1990 until 1991, the Los Angeles Dodgers from 1992 until 1993, the Boston Red Sox in 1999 and the Houston Astros in 2000. He played his final MLB game on May 29, 2000.

On May 10, 1994, Gross was purchased from the Los Angeles Dodgers by the Nippon Ham Fighters of the Japanese Pacific League.  This explains his absence from Major League Baseball from 1994 until 1998. He was highly successful in Japan, leading the league in wins from 1995 until 1996. He returned to the United States in 1998 to undergo surgery. He is remembered by baseball enthusiasts as one of the finest non-Japanese players to have played in the Japanese Leagues and for the Nippon Ham Fighters.

In 2010, he was the manager, pitching coach, hitting coach & GM for the Victoria Seals in the Golden Baseball League.

References

External links

 Baseball Almanac
 Baseball Historian
Retrosheet
The Baseball Gauge
Venezuela Winter League

1964 births
Living people
Albuquerque Dukes players
American expatriate baseball players in Japan
Baseball players from Nebraska
Boston Red Sox players
Cincinnati Reds players
Colorado Springs Sky Sox players
Houston Astros players
Hyannis Harbor Hawks players
Jackson Mets players
Las Vegas 51s players
Leones del Caracas players
American expatriate baseball players in Venezuela
Los Angeles Dodgers players
Lynchburg Mets players
Major League Baseball pitchers
Minor league baseball managers
Nashville Sounds players
Nebraska Cornhuskers baseball players
New Orleans Zephyrs players
Nippon Ham Fighters players
Pawtucket Red Sox players
People from Scottsbluff, Nebraska
St. Lucie Mets players
Tidewater Tides players
University of Nebraska alumni
Anchorage Glacier Pilots players